The 1989 DFB-Pokal Final decided the winner of the 1988–89 DFB-Pokal, the 46th season of Germany's premier knockout football cup competition. It was played on 24 June 1989 at the Olympiastadion in West Berlin. Borussia Dortmund won the match 4–1 against Werder Bremen to claim their second cup title.

Route to the final
The DFB-Pokal began with 64 teams in a single-elimination knockout cup competition. There were a total of five rounds leading up to the final. Teams were drawn against each other, and the winner after 90 minutes would advance. If still tied, 30 minutes of extra time was played. If the score was still level, a replay would take place at the original away team's stadium. If still level after 90 minutes, 30 minutes of extra time was played. If the score was still level, a drawing of lots would decide who would advance to the next round.

Note: In all results below, the score of the finalist is given first (H: home; A: away).

Match

Details

References

External links
 Match report at kicker.de 
 Match report at WorldFootball.net
 Match report at Fussballdaten.de 

Borussia Dortmund matches
SV Werder Bremen matches
1988–89 in German football cups
1989
June 1989 sports events in Europe
1980s in West Berlin
1989 in Berlin
1989 in West Germany
Football competitions in Berlin
Sports competitions in West Berlin